Husseystown (Baile Hoisé in Irish) is a townland in the barony of Iffa and Offa West, County Tipperary in Ireland. It is located in the civil parish of Caher.

References

Townlands of County Tipperary
Iffa and Offa West